In abstract algebra, the field of fractions of an integral domain is the smallest field in which it can be embedded. The construction of the field of fractions is modeled on the relationship between the integral domain of integers and the field of rational numbers. Intuitively, it consists of ratios between integral domain elements.

All four are in common usage, but are not to be confused with the quotient of a ring by an ideal, which is a quite different concept. For a commutative ring which is not an integral domain, the analogous construction is called the localization or ring of quotients.

Definition 

This notion of equivalence is motivated by the rational numbers , which have the same property with respect to the underlying ring  of integers.

Then the field of fractions is the set  with addition given by
  
and multiplication given by 

One may check that these operations are well-defined and that, for any integral domain ,  is indeed a field.

This is modeled on the identity .

if  is an injective ring homomorphism from  into a field , then there exists a unique ring homomorphism  which extends .

There is a categorical interpretation of this construction. Let  be the category of integral domains and injective ring maps.

A multiplicative identity is not required for the role of the integral domain; this construction can be applied to any nonzero commutative rng  with no nonzero zero divisors.

Examples 

 The field of fractions of the ring of integers is the field of rationals: .
 Let  be the ring of Gaussian integers. Then , the field of Gaussian rationals.
 The field of fractions of a field is canonically isomorphic to the field itself.

Generalizations

Localization 

Two special cases of this are notable:

Semifield of fractions 
The semifield of fractions of a commutative semiring with no zero divisors is the smallest semifield in which it can be embedded.

The elements of the semifield of fractions of the commutative semiring  are equivalence classes written as

See also 
 Ore condition; condition related to constructing fractions in the noncommutative case.
 Projective line over a ring; alternative structure not limited to integral domains.
 Total ring of fractions

References 

Field (mathematics)
Commutative algebra